Frank or Francis Jenkins or Frances Jenkins may refer to:

 Frances C. Jenkins (1826-1915), American evangelist and temperance worker
 Frank Jenkins (footballer)  (1918–1987), Australian rules footballer
 Frank Jenkins (musician) (1888–?), American fiddler and banjo player
 Frank Jenkins (ice hockey) (1859–1930), Canadian ice hockey player, founder of the Ottawa Hockey Club
 Frank Jenkins (priest) (1923–2011), Dean of Monmouth
 Frank Lynn Jenkins (1870–1927), British sculptor
 Francis Jenkins (East India Company officer), Commissioner of Assam 1834–1861

See also
 SS C. Francis Jenkins